George Baker Selection was a pop-rock band from Assendelft, the Netherlands. The band is best-known for the 1969 song "Little Green Bag" and the 1975 world-wide hit "Paloma Blanca".

History 
In 1968, Hans Bouwens from Wormerveer joined the band "Soul Invention", a soul band that had been founded the previous year by Henk Kramer in Assendelft and played covers of songs by Otis Redding and Sam and Dave. The band consisted of Job Netten (guitar), Henk Kramer and Eric Bardoen (saxophone), Jacques Greuter (keyboard and flute), Theo Vermast and later Jan Visser (bass), and Ton Vredenburg (drums). Visser and Bouwens wrote the song "Little Greenback" (sic) in the summer of 1969. The band recorded their first album in September 1969, after which, considering this was no soul music, they changed their name to "The George Baker Selection", Bouwens naming himself for a character from a detective novel. This first album, Little Green Bag (1970), produced an immediate worldwide hit: their debut single, "Little Green Bag," reached No. 16 on the Cash Box magazine chart and No. 21 on the Billboard Top 100 in the United States. The success came as a surprise for Baker, who remembers hearing it on the radio while he was working in a lemonade factory. The single sold over one million copies globally and received a gold disc. A string of singles and albums followed; the second single, "Dear Ann," was such a success that Baker resigned from his job in the lemonade factory and became a full-time musician. Not all band members followed suit and, besides Bouwens, the "Selection" from mid 1970 was formed by Jan Visser, Jan Hop (drums), Jacques Greuter and George Thé (voice, guitar, bass). In March 1971 Jan Visser left the band to be replaced by Cor Veerman. Besides scoring hits with his own Selection, Baker also wrote songs for others, including BZN, The Shoes, Andy Star, and Next One. In 1974, singer Lida Bond joined the Selection, and combining her voice with Baker's proved highly successful.

Their fifth album, Paloma Blanca, was released in 1975, and the single "Paloma Blanca" reached No. 1 on charts in several countries. It sold more than seven million copies worldwide, making it one of the most successful Dutch singles ever.

In 1978, the George Baker Selection split up because "the pressure had become too much." The band has sold over 20 million records worldwide. George Baker formed a new George Baker Selection in 1982, which stayed together until 1989. The band has released twelve albums and several compilation albums.

The band experienced a brief return to the international charts in 1992 when the song "Little Green Bag" was used in the title sequence of the film Reservoir Dogs and in Machos, a Chilean soap opera in 2003. The song is also featured in a Moto X smartphone commercial circa 2013.

Members 

Hans Bouwens (as George Baker) (composer, vocals, guitar, mandolin, flute, piano and organ) 1968–1977, 1982–1989.
Elly Bloothoofd (vocals, guitar) 1982–1989.
Lida Jonkman-Bond (vocals) 1974–1977.
Nelleke Brzoskowsky (vocals) 1982–1989.
Willy Delano (vocals) 1977, 1982–1989.
Pieter Goeman (organ and piano) 1982–1989.
Jacques Greuter (vocals, organ, flute and piano) 1967–1982.
Jan Hop (drums) 1969–77, 1983–1989.
Henk Kramer (saxophone) 1967–1970.
Nathalie Más (vocals) between 1977 and 1982.
Job Netten (guitar) 1967–1970.
Martin Schoen (bass) between 1974 and 1982. 
George Thé (vocals, guitar and bass) 1970–77, 1983–1989. 
Cor Veerman (as Alan Decker) (bass) 1971–1974.
Theo Vermast (bass) 1967–1968.
Jan Visser (bass) 1968–1971.
Ton Vredenburg (drums) 1967–1970.

Discography

Studio albums

Compilations
 5 Jaar Hits (1974) NL No. 3
The Best Of Baker (1977) NL No. 8
Het komplete hitoverzicht (1986) NL No. 12
Dreamboat (1988) NL No. 21
 The Very Best Of (1999) NL No. 24
 George Baker Selection 100 NL No. 67
 The Golden Years Of Dutch Pop Music NL No. 68

Singles

References 

Dutch musical groups
Musical groups established in 1967
Musical groups disestablished in 1989